Windows-1258 is a code page used in Microsoft Windows to represent Vietnamese texts. It makes use of combining diacritical marks.

Windows-1258 is compatible with neither the Vietnamese standard (TCVN 5712 / VSCII), nor the various other encodings in use in practice (VISCII, VNI, VPS). Rather, it is very similar to Windows-1252, with the differences being that s-caron and z-caron (which were added to Windows-1252 later) are missing, five of the letters with diacritics have been replaced by combining diacritics for Vietnamese tone marks, one has been replaced with the đông sign, and eight others (four per case) have been changed to four otherwise-unsupported Vietnamese letters.

Use of combining diacritics means that Windows-1258 can cover the large number of combinations of letters and tone marks in Vietnamese without compromising coverage of control codes or symbols. However it also means that software must be careful to handle conversions between precomposed characters and combining sequences correctly when converting to/from other encodings and makes determining user-visible length of a string more difficult.

IBM uses code page 1258 (CCSID 1258 and euro sign extended CCSID 5354) for Windows-1258.

UTF-8 is the preferred encoding for Vietnamese in modern applications. Windows-1258 may not always round-trip Unicode encoded Vietnamese due to changes caused by Unicode normalization. Combining diacritics are encoded after the letter in both Windows-1258 and Unicode (like VNI, unlike ANSEL).

Character set
The following table shows Windows-1258. Each character is shown with its Unicode equivalent.

Code page 1129
IBM's code page 1129 (CCSID 1129 and euro sign extended CCSID 1163) is similar to code page 1258, but with the following differences:

See also
VSCII
VISCII
VNI Character Set
VPS character encoding

References

External links
IANA Charset Name Registration of windows-1258
Michael Kaplan's blog describing the Windows 1258 encoding behavior

Windows code pages